The Ghazala Gardens hotel (فندق غزالة) was a 176-room, four-star establishment in the Naama Bay area of the Egyptian beach resort of Sharm el-Sheikh, on the Sinai Peninsula. Its sister hotel, the Ghazala Beach, is across the street and is substantially larger. On July 23, 2005, at about 01:15 local time (22:15 UTC) a terrorist drove a pickup truck laden with explosives through the glass façade and into the front lobby. Seconds later, the truck exploded, killing a number of people and razing the lobby. It is not known exactly how many died in the Ghazala Garden attack, but a total of about 90 were killed in the series of attacks that night. In the weeks after the blasts the remains of the hotel were demolished.

Reconstruction 
After the July 23rd attacks the hotel was rebuilt. The newly constructed Ghazala Gardens Hotel was built in a Moorish style and it now has 284 comfortable double rooms that are divided into several 2 storey buildings which are dotted around landscaped gardens.

External links 

 Description of the attack from The Guardian

Hotels in Egypt